Chalcosyrphus vagans is a species of hoverfly in the family Syrphidae.

Distribution
Panama, Guyana, Brazil.

References

Eristalinae
Insects described in 1830
Diptera of South America
Taxa named by Christian Rudolph Wilhelm Wiedemann